Damn You may refer to:

Television
"Damn You, Eggs Benedict", 2008 episode of Two and a Half Men (season 6)

Music
"Damn U", song by Prince
"Damn You", song from Rebelution (Tanya Stephens album)
"Damn You", song from Stronger (Hanna Pakarinen album)